"Never Leave You (Uh Oooh, Uh Oooh)" is a song by American recording artist Lumidee, released as her debut single on May 12, 2003, from her first album, Almost Famous (2003). The official remix features Fabolous and Busta Rhymes. "Never Leave You (Uh Oooh, Uh Oooh)" peaked at number three on the Billboard Hot 100. Outside of the United States, "Never Leave You (Uh Oooh, Uh Oooh)" topped the charts in Belgium (Flanders), Germany, Italy, the Netherlands, and Switzerland, and peaked within the top ten of the charts in many other countries, including Austria, Belgium (Wallonia), Denmark, and the United Kingdom.

Background
The original mix of the song was recorded by DJ Tedsmooth, a native of Spanish Harlem where Lumidee was raised, for DJ Tedsmooth's independent record label Straight Face. The song became the number 1 requested song on many New York radio stations. The success resulted in many major record label offering deals to both Lumidee and DJ Tedsmooth. After signing with Universal, the song was remixed with guest appearances by Busta Rhymes and Fabolous.

The song gained popularity because of its slightly altered use of the already wildly popular Diwali riddim by then-up-and-coming dancehall producer Steven "Lenky" Marsden. "Diwali" was one of the most internationally successful dancehall rhythms of all time, garnering hits for Wayne Wonder ("No Letting Go"), T.O.K. ("Galang Gal"), Bounty Killer and Wayne Marshall's "Sufferer", Elephant Man ("Elephant Message"), and Sean Paul ("Get Busy").  But since "Never Leave You" was an R&B song by an R&B singer over a dancehall riddim, sound system selectors, club DJs and urban market radio stations immediately took notice of this unique factor and started playing it heavily and regularly, mixing it in with the other songs on the rhythm. It remains the most successful song of Lumidee's career so far, regarding chart positions, and her only hit to date. The song was most successful in Europe, reaching number 1 in five countries. It peaked at number 1 in Belgium, Germany, Italy, The Netherlands and Switzerland in August–September 2003. It also charted at number 2 in the United Kingdom. It also reached number 1 on the Eurochart Hot 100 Singles. Nevertheless, the song peaked at number 3 on the Billboard Hot 100 chart in her own country.
"Never Leave You" was incorporated into the 2010 re-release of the Diwali riddim album on Greensleeves/VP Records. It included other songs derived from the Diwali riddim, along with Sean Paul's "Get Busy," which was a late entry that never made the original release.

Composition
"Never Leave You (Uh Ooh, Uh Ooh)" is an R&B song written by Lumidee Cedeño, Teddy "Tedsmooth" Mendez and Eddie Perez, and features a prominent dancehall reggae riddim called "Diwali" written by Steven "Lenky" Marsden, although it is slightly altered from the original riddim.

Belgian artist Luc van Acker made allegations that the song resembles "Zanna," a song he wrote. However, in an interview he said Belgian anti-piracy agency SABAM advised him not to waste money on a lawsuit.

Music video
The music video of "Never Leave You (Uh Oooh, Uh Oooh)" was directed by Nzingha Stewart and it features American actor J.D. Williams as Lumidee's love interest.

Other uses 
The song was also used multiple times in the 2004 film Confessions of a Teenage Drama Queen, which starred Lindsay Lohan.

On March 3, 2023, Trinidadian rapper Nicki Minaj released for single "Red Ruby Da Sleeze" which heavily samples "Never Leave You".

Chart performance
"Never Leave You (Uh Ooh, Uh Ooh)" debuted at number sixty-one on the Billboard Hot 100. Due to the increase of radio plays for the song, it later ascended up the chart from number ten to number five, before peaking at number three on the Billboard Hot 100.

In the United Kingdom, the song debuted and peaked at number two on the UK Singles Chart on August 3, 2003 – for the week ending date August 9, 2003 – beaten to the summit by Blu Cantrell and Sean Paul's "Breathe".

The song reached the top spot on Billboards European Hot 100, after it jumped from number three to the top of the charts in the Netherlands and number seven to the top of the charts in Germany.

Track listings
Maxi single

Personnel
 Lumidee – lead vocals, background vocals
 DJ Tedsmooth – producer
 Trendsetta – producer, drums, programming, mixing, engineering, keyboards
 Stevie J. – engineering, mixing
 Jamie "S.S" Garcia – mixing assistant

Charts

Weekly charts

Year-end charts

Decade-end charts

Certifications

Release history

See also
 Hot 100 number-one hits of 2003 (Europe)
 Ultratop 50 number-one hits of 2003
 Dutch Top 40 number-one hits of 2003
 Number-one hits of 2003 (Germany)
 FIMI number-one hits of 2003
 List of Swiss number-one hits of 2003

References

2003 songs
2003 debut singles
Lumidee songs
Fabolous songs
Busta Rhymes songs
Ivy Queen songs
Universal Records singles
Songs written by Lumidee
Ultratop 50 Singles (Flanders) number-one singles
European Hot 100 Singles number-one singles
Number-one singles in Germany
Number-one singles in Italy
Dutch Top 40 number-one singles
Number-one singles in Switzerland
Songs written by Steven "Lenky" Marsden
Songs written by Fabolous